Diesel is a game engine developed and used by Grin. The engine was originally developed for their game Ballistics and has been used, albeit with modifications, in a number of other games since then. The first installment of the engine was developed in close collaboration with Nvidia, aimed to showcase the capabilities of their latest graphics chip at the time, the GeForce 3. The engine is currently in use by Overkill Software, former owners of the now defunct developer Grin. Overkill's game, Payday: The Heist, uses a modified version of this engine. Payday 2 and Raid: World War II run on the second generation Diesel engine 2.0.

Games

References

2001 software
 
Lua (programming language)-scriptable game engines
Video game engines